Sedgwick House is a historic home located at Bath in Steuben County, New York.  It was built between 1840 and 1854 and is a -story Italianate style brick dwelling coated with stucco.  The low pitched hipped roof features a prominent cupola.

It was listed on the National Register of Historic Places in 1983.

References

Houses on the National Register of Historic Places in New York (state)
Italianate architecture in New York (state)
Houses completed in 1854
Houses in Steuben County, New York
National Register of Historic Places in Steuben County, New York